Othmane Bali, real name Mbarek Athmany, (May 1953 – June 2005) was an Algerian Tuareg singer.

Early life
Bali issued his first album in 1986, and afterward worked on promoting Tuareg music in the Tamahaq language. Bali worked with world-famous singers such as Steve Shehan.

Death
Bali died in an accident in his car after the flooding of a river in his native region of Djanet. After his death, his son Nabil Bali continued his legacy and took the same path as his father.

References

1953 births
2005 deaths
20th-century Algerian male singers
21st-century Algerian male singers
Road incident deaths in Algeria
People from Illizi Province